Robert Earl Woods (born July 26, 1950) is a former American football offensive tackle who played eight seasons in the National Football League for the New York Jets and New Orleans Saints. He also played for the Birmingham Stallions and Memphis Showboats of the United States Football League.  Woods played college football at Tennessee State University. He was selected by the Associated Press as a first-team running back on the 1972 Little All-America college football team.

References

1950 births
Living people
People from Rogersville, Alabama
Players of American football from Alabama
American football offensive tackles
Tennessee State Tigers football players
New York Jets players
New Orleans Saints players
Birmingham Stallions players
Memphis Showboats players